Jingshan is a county-level city of Jingmen City, in central Hubei Province, People's Republic of China. It is named after nearby Mount Jingyuan. It is bordered on the north by the Dahong Mountain and on the south by the Jianghan Plain. It has one economic development zone, jurisdiction 14 towns. Jingshan is located approximately one hour's drive from the provincial capital Wuhan.

Administrative divisions

There are 14 towns in Jingshan:

Climate

Population
In 2002, 636,100 people lived in Jingshan. 403,100 of them were rural inhabitants whilst 233,000 formed the urban population. 320,100 of them were male and 316,000 female. The central towns have a total population of 233,200 inhabitants, 15,500 of them are mobile. In Jingshan the population density is 181 people per km2 with an average life expectancy of 74.12 years.

By the end of 2016, 645,900 people lived in Jingshan; 332,272 male and 313,713 female.

Natural resources

Land resources
At the end of 2002, the city had 98846.37 hectares (1482695.6 acres) of farmland (29.56% of the total area), 31776.07 hectares (476641.00 acres) of water (9.51%) and 43040.54 hectares of unused land (645608.10 acres) accounting for 12.88% of the total.

Mineral resources
Jingshan has rich mineral resources. After years of extensive geological studies, more than 20 kinds of minerals have been found in Jingshan. The main non-metallic mineral mines in the city include limestone (500 million tons), dolomite (700 million tons) and Silica (300 million tons).

Water resources
The rivers of Jingshan are mainly fed by surface water and groundwater. The annual precipitation averages 1179 mm and the average annual runoff adds up to 350.5 mm, equivalent to 1.173 billion cubic meters. There are more than 500 rivers, 68 of them more than 10 kilometers long. Inside the county, the Block Reservoir, Ponds contain a total 1.329 billion cubic meters of water.

Animal and plant resources
Major crops are rice, barley, broad beans, soybeans, and many varieties of corn . Native products are mainly mushrooms, fungi, bridge meters, chestnut, tea and seedless watermelons.

The flora in Jingshan derive from 73 branches, 146 genera and 247 species.

Pangolins, wolves, bifurcates, leopards, parrots and wildlife in general are protected according to law within the territory of the state.

Industry and economy
In 2005, the city achieved a GDP of 7.1 billion. There are more than 100 enterprises, eleven of which are 10 million euro enterprises. 39 of them are 10 million yuan enterprises. Yearly exports  reached 48 million U.S. dollars in 2005.

Construction, machinery manufacturing, materials processing, textiles and garments, chemical metallurgy and food processing shape the five industrial clusters.

References

County-level divisions of Hubei
Jingmen